The Reclus family, largely known as the progeny and extended family of pastor Jacques Reclus, became known for their distinctive careers in geography, anarchism, journalism, medicine, and other fields during the 19th and 20th centuries.

Tree 

 Jacques Reclus (1796–1882), pastor
 Élie Reclus (1827–1904), ethnographer and anarchist
 Paul Reclus (1858–1941), engineer, teacher, and anarchist
 Jacques Reclus (1894–1984), anarchist
 Élisée Reclus (1830–1905), geographer and anarchist
 Onésime Reclus (1837–1916), geographer
 Maurice Reclus (1883–1972), historian
 Armand Reclus (1843–1927), geographer
 Paul Reclus (1847–1914), surgeon

Bibliography 

 Les Amis de Sainte-Foy et sa région
 Hélène Sarrazin (prés.), Scènes d'une pauvre vie par le pasteur Jacques Reclus, 1992, cahier 1, p. 13-27, link.
 Pr Félix Lejars, Éloge de Paul Reclus lu à la Société de chirurgie de Paris le 22 janvier 1919, reproduit en 1992, cahier 2, p. 25-35, link.
 Jean-Pierre Faure (fils d’Élie Faure), Recherches sur l'esthétique d'Élie Faure, 1992, cahier 2, p. 40-45, link.
 Alain Leduc, Henry Miller, lecteur d'Élie Faure, n° 63, 1993, p. 38-44, link.
 Marie-Madeleine Guesnon, Famille Reclus, n° 69, 1996, p. 19-31, link.
 Danièle Provain, Note sur Élisée Reclus, n° 69, 1996, p. 32-35, link.
 Roger Gonot, Faisons connaissance avec Onésime Reclus, n° 70, 1997, p. 33-53, link.
 Roger Gonot, Physionomies : Élie Reclus (1827-1904), Élisée Reclus (1830-1905), Onésime Reclus (1843-1916), n° 73, 1998, p. 4-19, link.
 Jean Suret-Canale, Élisée Reclus et le darwinisme, n° 73, 1998, p. 20-21, link.
 Pierre Lamothe, Le maroquin rouge [Notes sur la fratrie Reclus par leur oncle Pierre Léonce Chaucherie], n° 73, 1998, p. 22-32, link.
 Henri Besson-Imbert, Notes de lectures [sur Pauline Kergomard par Geneviève et Alain Kergomard], n° 79, 2002, p. 63-65, link.
 Danièle Provain, Pourquoi sommes-nous reclusiens ?, n° 84, 2004, p. 5-7, link.
 Henri Besson-Imbert, Arbre de descendance d’Élie Reclus, n° 84, 2004, p. 2-4, link.
 Andrée Despy-Meyer, Élie Reclus, un ethnologue et un mythologue méconnu, n° 84, 2004, p. 8-20, link.
 Élie et Élisée Reclus, Unions libres [1882], n° 84, 2004, p. 21-37, link.
 Danièle Provain, Notre ami Roger Gonot [et les Reclus], n° 84, 2004, p. 38-40, link.
 Henri Besson-Imbert, Arbre d’ascendance et de descendance d’Élie Reclus, n° 85, 2005, p. 3-8, link.
 Danièle Provain, Note de lecture [sur « La poule » d’Élie Reclus], n° 85, 2005, p. 9-10, link.
 Danièle Provain, L’année 2005 : Élisée Reclus ?, n° 86, 2005, p. 4-5, link.
 Philippe Pelletier, La géographie innovante d’Élisée Reclus, n° 86, 2005, p. 6-38, link.
 Jean-Louis Claverie, Zéline Trigant de la Faniouse (1805-1887) "l’inoubliable", Jacques Reclus (1796-1882) son mari, "l’intransigeant", n° 86, 2005, p. 39-47, link.
 Jeanne Vigouroux, Élisée Reclus et l'Algérie (1884-1905), n° 89, 2007, p. 3-15, link.
 Danièle Provain, Michelet, les Reclus, hôtes de Vascœuil, n° 90, 2007, p. 19-27, link.
 Zéline Faure, L’ultime larme, souvenirs de Zizou (Zéline Faure) sur son père Élie Faure [Marie-Zéline Faure, 1904-1997], n° 91, 2008, p. 27-37, link.
 Jeanne Vigouroux, Patrick Geddes (1854-1932) [et les Reclus], n° 92, 2008, p. 7-17, link.
 Jeanne Vigouroux, Paul Reclus, aux risques de l’anarchisme, n° 94, 2009, p. 20-34, link.
 Jeanne Vigouroux, Élisée Reclus et les juifs, une mise au point nécessaire, n° 99, 2012, p. 21-28, link.
 Danièle Provain, Un cas d’école : l’inspecteur Jean Reclus (1794-1869), n° 101, 2013, p. 14-18, link.
 Jeanne Vigouroux, Jules Steeg (1836-1898), ardent défenseur de la laïcité, n° 101, 2013, p. 19-27, link.
 Une série de Portraits :
 Alain Morel, Jean Pierre Michel dit Élie Reclus (1827-1904), mise en ligne le 2 septembre 2014, link.
 Jeanne Vigouroux, Élisée Reclus (1830-1905), mise en ligne le 13 mai 2010, link.
 Alain Morel, Joseph Onésime Reclus (1837-1916), mise en ligne le 18 juillet 2014, link.
 Alain Morel, Élie Armand Ebenhezer Reclus (1843-1927), mise en ligne le 17 juillet 2014, link.
 Jeanne Vigouroux, Paul Reclus (1858-1941), mise en ligne le 11 mai 2010, link.
 Danièle Provain, Jean-Louis Faure, 1863-1944, mise en ligne le 30 novembre 2010, link.
 
 
 Christophe Brun (éd.), Élisée Reclus, Les Grands Textes, Paris, Flammarion, coll. Champs classiques, 2014, 503 p. , textes systématiquement resitués dans un contexte familial notice, Philosophie Magazine.
 Gabrielle Cadier-Rey, Le Journal (imaginaire) de Zéline Reclus, Carrières-sous-Poissy, La Cause, 2009, 110 p.
 Gabrielle Cadier-Rey, Les Reclus au féminin, p. 1-15, et Robert Darrigrand, Le pasteur Jacques Reclus, p. 17-22, dans le Bulletin du Centre d’étude du protestantisme béarnais, Pau, Archives départementales des Pyrénées-Atlantiques, n° 40 « spécial Reclus », décembre 2006.
 Gabrielle Cadier-Rey et Danièle Provain (éd.), Lettres de Zéline Reclus à son fils Armand, 1867-1874, Pau, Centre d’étude du protestantisme béarnais, Archives départementales des Pyrénées-Atlantiques, 2012.
 
 Lucien Carrive (éd.), Lettres écrites par les filles du pasteur Jacques Reclus à Zoé Tuyès (Steeg), 1856-1863, dans le Bulletin de la Société d’histoire du protestantisme français, avril-juin 1997, p. 189-244, et octobre-décembre 1997, p. 663-730, notice.
 Maurice Colombo & Didier Roy (éd.), Élisée Reclus, Chelles, revue Itinéraire : une vie, une pensée 14–15, 1998, notice, pages 100-107.
 Jean Corriger & Henri Rey-Lescure, Cette étonnante famille des Reclus, dans Notre Prochain (bulletin des Asiles pour enfants de la Fondation John Bost, La Force, Dordogne), n° 171, 1967-12-01, p. 45-50, accès en ligne.
 Gary S. Dunbar & Louise Rapacka, Two French Geographers : Paul Reclus and Louis Cuisinier, dans Geographers, Biobibliographical Studies, vol. 16, Londres, Mansell, 1995, p. 88-100.
 André Janmotte & Paul Glansdorf, notice François Bouny dans la Biographie nationale publiée par l’Académie royale des Sciences, des Lettres et des Beaux-Arts de Belgique, Bruxelles, Émile Bruylant, 1981, t. 42 (supplément), p. 82a-100b, link.
 Geneviève Kergomard & Alain Kergomard (ed.), Pauline Kergomard créatrice de la maternelle moderne, correspondances privées, rapports aux ministres, Rodez, Le Fil d’Ariane, 2000.
 Michel & Jacques Reclus (ed.), Paul Reclus, Les Frères Élie et Élisée Reclus ou du protestantisme à l'anarchisme, Paris, Les Amis d'Élisée Reclus, 1964.

French families